A list of films produced in Brazil in 1948:

See also
 1948 in Brazil

External links
Brazilian films of 1948 at the Internet Movie Database

Brazil
1948
Films